Taisha Canton is a canton of Ecuador, located in the Morona-Santiago Province.  Its capital is the town of Taisha.  Its population at the 2001 census was 13,078.

Demographics
Ethnic groups as of the Ecuadorian census of 2010:
Indigenous  95.9%
Mestizo  3.8%
White  0.3%
Afro-Ecuadorian  0.1%
Montubio  0.0%
Other  0.0%

References

Cantons of Morona-Santiago Province